Army Garrison, Bampur ( – Pādegān-e Nez̧āmī Ārtesh) is a village and military installation in Bampur-e Sharqi Rural District, in the Central District of Bampur County, Sistan and Baluchestan Province, Iran. At the 2006 census, its population was 92, in 33 families.

References 

Populated places in Bampur County
Military installations of Iran